Ricco van Prooijen (born 1973) is a Dutch professional bridge player.

Bridge accomplishments

Wins

 Bermuda Bowl (1) 2011 
 North American Bridge Championships (2)
 Spingold (1) 2009 
 von Zedtwitz Life Master Pairs (1) 2008

Runners-up

 World Olympiad Teams Championship (1) 2004
 North American Bridge Championships (1)
 Vanderbilt (1) 2013

References

External links
 
 

1973 births
Living people
Dutch contract bridge players
Bermuda Bowl players